Harry Knight may refer to:
Harry Knight (racing driver), American racecar driver
Harry Knight (farmer) (1860–1935), New Zealand farmer, politician and racehorse owner
Harry Knight (Canadian football) (born 1953), American football quarterback
Harry Adam Knight, writer
Harry Knight, character in A Pair of Blue Eyes

See also
Henry Knight (disambiguation)
Harold Knight (1874–1961), English painter
H. M. Knight (Harold Murray Knight, 1919–2015), Australian economist